Surendra Mohan Ghose (22 April 1893 – 7 September 1976) was an Indian politician in the Jugantar Party during the time of Indian Independence, and a close associate of Sarat Chandra Basu and  Maharaj Trailokyanath Chakraborty. He was elected to the lower House of Parliament the Lok Sabha from Malda, West Bengal  as a member of the Indian National Congress. He was a member of the Constituent Assembly of India representing West Bengal.

References

External links
Official biographical sketch in Parliament of India website

1893 births
1976 deaths
India MPs 1952–1957
Indian National Congress politicians
Lok Sabha members from West Bengal
Members of the Constituent Assembly of India
Ananda Mohan College alumni